Li Guojie (born 29 May 1943) is a Chinese computer scientist who served as dean of the School of Computer and Control Engineering, University of the Chinese Academy of Sciences.

Biography
Li was born in Shaoyang, Hunan, Republic of China, on May 29, 1943. His father, Li Binqing, was an educator who served as president of Shaodong County No.2 High School after the establishment of the Communist State. After high school in 1960, he was accepted to Hunan Agricultural Mechanization College. Because the school was closed, he was assigned to work as a mechanic in Lengshuijiang Iron and Steel Factory. In September 1962 he entered Peking University, majoring in the Department of Physics, where he graduated in 1968. In December 1968 he was assigned to a farm in southwest China's Guizhou province. A year and a half later, he was assigned to a crystal factory in the suburb of the capital city Guiyang. In February 1973, he was transferred to a computer factory in his home-city Shaoyang. After the resumption of National College Entrance Examination, he earned his Master of Engineering degree from the University of Chinese Academy of Sciences in August 1981. He earned his doctor's degree at Purdue University under the direction of Benjamin Wah. He was a researcher at the University of Illinois between August 1985 and December 1986. He returned to China in January 1987 and became a researcher at the Institute of Computing Technology, Chinese Academy of Sciences. In February 1990 he was appointed director of the State Intelligent Computer Research and Development Center by the State Scientific and Technological Commission. In 1995 he founded the Shuguang Information Industry Co., Ltd. He assumed the position of director of the Institute of Computing Technology, Chinese Academy of Sciences in December 1999, and remained dean until January 2011. In January 2012 he was chosen as dean of the School of Computer and Control Engineering, University of Chinese Academy of Sciences. He was president of China Computer Federation (CCF).

He was a delegate to the 9th and 10th National People's Congress. He was a delegate to the 17th National Congress of the Communist Party of China.

Personal life
Li married Zhang Dihua, the daughter of Zhang Qixian, an engineer who died in Yemen. The couple have a son named Li Gang, and a daughter named Li Juan.

Honours and awards
 1994 Science and Technology Progress Award of the Ho Leung Ho Lee Foundation 
 1995 State Science and Technology Progress Award (Second Class) 
 1997 State Science and Technology Progress Award (First Class) 
 November 1995 Member of the Chinese Academy of Engineering (CAE) 
 2001 State Science and Technology Progress Award (Second Class) 
 2004 State Science and Technology Progress Award (Second Class) 
 2011 Fellow of The World Academy of Sciences

References

1943 births
Living people
People from Shaoyang
Engineers from Hunan
TWAS fellows
Peking University alumni
University of the Chinese Academy of Sciences alumni
Purdue University alumni
Members of the Chinese Academy of Engineering
Delegates to the 9th National People's Congress
Delegates to the 10th National People's Congress
Chinese computer scientists